Cintegabelle is a commune in the Haute-Garonne department in southwestern France.

Geography
The commune is bordered by ten other communes, five of them is in Haute-Garonne and five of them is in Ariège: Auterive to the northwest, Mauvaisin to the north, Aignes to the northeast, Calmont to the east, Gaillac-Toulza to the southwest, and finally by the department of Ariège to the southeast, south, and southwest by the communes of Saint-Quirc and Lissac to the southwest, Labatut to the south, and Saverdun and Canté to the southeast.

Population
The inhabitants of the commune are called Cintegabellois in French.

Transport
 Cintegabelle station, on the line from Toulouse to Foix and Latour-de-Carol.

See also
Communes of the Haute-Garonne department

References

Communes of Haute-Garonne